Plurinationality, plurinational, or plurinationalism is defined as the coexistence of two or more sealed or preserved national groups within a polity (an organized community or body of peoples). In plurinationalism, the idea of nationality is plural, meaning there are many nationals within an organized community or body of peoples.  Derived from this concept, a plurinational state is the existence of multiple political communities and constitutional asymmetry.  The usage of plurinationality assists in avoiding the division of societies within a state or country.  Furthermore, a plurinational democracy recognizes the multiple demoi (common people or populace) within a polity. Reportedly the term has its origin in the Indigenous political movement in Bolivia where it was first heard of in the early 1980s. As of 2022 Bolivia and Ecuador are constitutionally defined as plurinational states.

Plurinationalism in Chile
In Chile constitutional plurinationalism has been a topic of debate. Plurinationalism was not a concept in the constitutional reforms proposed by Michelle Bachelet's second government (2014–2018), yet the proposed reforms included recognition of Chile's indigenous peoples. The 2022 proposed Political Constitution of the Republic of Chile defined Chile as "plurinational", however this proposal was rejected by a large margin in September 2022. Prior to the dismissal of the proposed constitution the issue of pluranationalism was noted by polls and El País as particularly divisive in Chile. The creation of a "plurinational region" in southern Chile has been proposed by some scholars and activists as a solution to the Mapuche conflict. 

Plurinationalism has been criticized by José Rodríguez Elizondo as being used to advance Bolivian claims against Chile for sovereign access to the Pacific Ocean.

See also
Biculturalism
Consociationalism
Federal state
Multiculturalism
Multilateralism
Multinationalism (disambiguation)
National personal autonomy
Pan-nationalism
Pillarisation
Plurinational State of Bolivia
Unitary state

References

Further reading
Pallares, Amalia. The Politics of Disruption, From Pluriculturalism to Plurinationalism, From peasant struggles to Indian resistance: the Ecuadorian Andes in the late twentieth century, University of Oklahoma Press, 2002, 272 pages
MacDonald, Jr., Theodore. Ecuador's Indian Movement: Pawn in a Short Game or Agent in State Reconfiguration?
Masnou i Boixeda, Ramón.  3. Recognition and Respect in Plurinationalism, Notes on Nationalism, Gracewing Publishing, 2002, 146 pages

Multiculturalism
Cultural politics
Nationalism
Ethnicity in politics
Decentralization
1980s neologisms